Munugode Assembly constituency is a constituency of the Telangana Legislative Assembly, India. It is one of 12 constituencies in the Nalgonda district. It is part of Bhongir Lok Sabha constituency.

Komatireddy Rajagopal Reddy of Indian National Congress won the seat in 2018 Assembly election.

Kusukuntla Prabhakar Reddy of Telangana Rashtra Samithi won the seat for the first time in 2014 Assembly election.

Mandals
The Assembly Constituency presently comprises the following Mandals:

Members of Legislative Assembly

^ bypoll

Election results

2022 
 
TRS's Kusukuntla Prabhakar Reddy has won the Munugode bypoll with a margin of 10,113 votes.

2018

2014

2009

See also
 Munugode
 List of constituencies of Telangana Legislative Assembly

References

Assembly constituencies of Telangana
Assembly constituencies of Nalgonda district